La Libertad, officially the Municipality of La Libertad, is a 3rd class municipality in the province of Negros Oriental, Philippines. According to the 2020 census, it has a population of 41,089 people.

History
"The history of a nation is often interwoven with persons who in one way or another have been instrumental in its progress-political, educational, economic, social and to some extnt religious. Such is the history of a small barrio turned into a beautiful town.

"Hugging closely the coasts of Tanon Strait, and nesting cozily in the wide and fertile valley swept by the Hinoba-an River lines, La Libertad against a backdrop of sylvan scenery. It bears a Castillan name which connotes "freedom" and whose yesteryears are filled with tender memories."

"Barrio Hinoba-an During the Spanish Regime. The place was then inhabited by primitive tribes who were mostly Negritos. Several enterprising families from neighboring towns and distant provinces came to settle in this barrio. Among the first pioneers was a certain Pedro Absin. He came from the distant province of Camarines Sur with the Spanish friars, who spread the Christian religion to this part of Negros. He married a lovely lass who later was baptized as Mauricia. This was the beginning of the large and progressive Francisco Acar Absin clan."

"The other families were the Facturans from Jimalalud, the Carinals from Tayasan, and the de Paduas from Ilo-ilo. These people were the leading pioneer families of the "old" Hinoba-an. Most of them were engaged in farming and fishing."

"The fertile valleys of Hinoba-an were so enticing that several families immigrated to this barrio in the later part of the Spanish period. One of the prominent families that moved in was the Libo-on family. The head of this family was an Ilonggo. However, he did not come directly to Hinoba-an. A certain Maestro Tomas Libo-on of Miag-ao, Iloilo, arrived at the barrio of Jimalalud where he was employed as a private tutor by some families. He was a widower when he came but he brought with him his only son, Luciano, and a niece, Romana Libo-on. They lived in the barrio for several years. Later, Luciano was married to Bernabela Facturan, a native of the place. However, they were attracted by the richness of the soil of the neighboring barrio of Hinoba-an. They bought a pave of land at the mouth of the Hinoba-an River and built their first house there.

"Another family worthy of mention is the Banogon family. The head of this clan was Pio Banogon. Born on May 5, 1876, in Tanjay, another town of this province, Pio grew to be a promising young man. After he finished grade school, his parents sent him to Manila to study at San Juan de Letran for two years. When he returned home, he was so moved by the adventurous spirit that he decided to go northward. In 1896, he arrived at Jimalalud. It was in this barrio where he found his life's mate, one Petra Sevilla, a scion of the Facturans of Jimalalud. Like the others, the Banogons were also magnetized by the richness of the farmland of Hinoba-an. They bought some parcels of land at Canlaro in the barrio of San Jose and at Binatangan in Martilo."

"The other prominent families that moved to Hinoba-an were the Dionaldos from Moalboal, Cebu; the Somozas from Bais; the Emperados from Ayungon; and the Villaesters from Toledo, Cebu."

(lifted from "Souvenir Program 50th Anniversary of the creation of La Libertad as a Municipality of Negros Oriental, Dec 30, 31, 1968; Jan 1, 1969)

La Libertad was severely affected during the 2012 Visayas earthquake, that caused landslides killing dozens of people.

Geography

Barangays
La Libertad is politically subdivided into 29 barangays.

Climate

Economy

Education

Elementary schools:
 Agbobolo ES
 Aniniaw ES
 Aya ES
 Bagtic ES
 Bigaa ES
 Busilac ES
 Cangabo ES
 Eli ES
 Guihob ES
 Kansumandig ES
 La Libertad CES
 La Liberbertad North Pob PS
 Mambulod ES
 Mandapaton ES
 Manghulyawon ES
 Manluminsag ES
 Mapalasan ES
 Martilo ES
 Nasunggan ES
 Pacuan ES
 Pangca ES
 Pisong ES
 Pitogo ES
 San Jose ES
 Solonggon ES
 Tala-on ES
 Talostos ES

Secondary:
 La Libertad Technical Vocational School
 Pacuan National High School
 Saint Francis School (private)

Demographics

Tourism
The construction of swimming pool at La Limar had already been completed and is operational. Presently, La Limar is catering to seminars, weddings, family reunions and other services which is being handled by the Local Government.

The Local Government is now actively participating in the promotion of local tourism and we are showcasing our La Li Mar beach Resort located at San Jose, La Libertad.

The project was initiated by Congresswoman Jocelyn S. Limkaichong who was also a former mayor of the town.

Government
Elected municipal officials (2010–2013):
Mayor: Emmanuel Iway
Vice Mayor: Lawrence Limkaichong
Councilors:
 Nancy Temonio Laturnas
 Ronald Opada
 Ronie Bulabon
 Emelia Luz Medes
 Leonida Rios
 Jellenito Cayetano
 Bertoldo Burlasa
 Jovito Sabanal
 ABC President: Ronald Gallosa
 SK Federation President: PJ Arriesgado

List of former elective officials

References

External links
 [ Philippine Standard Geographic Code]
 Philippine Census Information
 Local Governance Performance Management System

Municipalities of Negros Oriental